The 2006 Atlantic 10 men's basketball tournament was played from March 8 to March 11, 2006, at U.S. Bank Arena in Cincinnati, Ohio.  The winner was named champion of the Atlantic 10 Conference and received an automatic bid to the 2006 NCAA Men's Division I Basketball Tournament.  Xavier University won the tournament. The top four teams in the conference received first-round byes, while Duquesne University and St. Bonaventure University were left out of the tournament as the bottom two teams in the conference standings. George Washington University entered the tournament undefeated in Atlantic 10 play, but lost to Temple University in the quarterfinals. George Washington earned an at-large bid to the NCAA tournament.

Bracket

All games played at U.S. Bank Arena in Cincinnati.* - Overtime

Atlantic 10 men's basketball tournament
Tournament
Atlantic 10 men's basketball tournament
Atlantic 10 men's basketball tournament
Basketball competitions in Cincinnati
College sports tournaments in Ohio
2000s in Cincinnati